An aventail or camail is a flexible curtain of mail attached to the skull of a helmet that extends to cover the throat, neck and shoulders. Part or all of the face, with spaces to allow vision, could also be covered. 

The earliest camails were riveted directly to the edge of the helmet, however, beginning in the 1320s in Western Europe a detachable version replaced this type. The detachable aventail was attached to a leather band, which was in turn attached to the lower border of the helmet by a series of pierced rivets, called vervelles. Holes in the leather band were passed over the vervelles, and a waxed cord was passed through the holes in the vervelles to secure it. Aventails were most commonly seen on bascinets in the 14th century and served as a replacement for a complete mail hood (coif). Some aventails were decorated with edging in brass or bronze links (sometimes gilded), or with a zig-zag lower edge (vandyked). By the mid 14th century, the aventail had replaced the mail coif completely. By the dawn of the 15th century, the plate armored neck guard of the Great Bascinet replaced the aventail.

References

Bibliography

External links

Medieval helmets
Western plate armour